Julian Mota Malonso (1923-2013) was a Filipino military man, educator and sports executive.

Early life
Julian Mota Malonso was born on October 18, 1923 in Binondo, Manila to Arayat-native Hilario and Meycauayan-native Marcela Mota. Julian Malonso was the second of five children.

Education and basketball career
Malonso studied at Letran College for his high school studies where he played for the school's basketball team. For his college he initially entered the University of the Philippines where he took up dentistry but moved to the University of Santo Tomas (UST) after he was approached by Father Agapio, who is the Spanish athletic director of UST. Agapio urged him to try out for UST's varsity basketball team. He pursued a course on education at UST.

He secured a place at UST's basketball team and played as a center. He was part of the squad of the UST Glowing Goldies that won the University Athletic Association of the Philippines in 1946. At , he was the second tallest player at that time in the country.

Malonso pursued a master's degree in education at the National University. He also played at the National Collegiate Athletic Association and the Manila Industrial and Commercial Athletic Association

Career as an educator and sports official
Malonso worked as a Spanish educator at Cagayan Valley Atheneum, UST High School and Letran College and Physical Education teacher at Uson Colleges. He served as two-time National Collegiate Athletic Association president and led the Gymnastics Association of the Philippines from 1963 to 1973.In 1997 he was named part of the Letran Sports Hall of Fame. He also served as the first president of the Metropolitan Basketball Association and secretary-general of the Asian Gymnastics Confederation.

He was provisional president of the Philippine Olympic Committee in 1980.

Later life and death
By November 2008, Malonso is writing a book entitled The Malonso Memoirs. By January 2009, Malonso has already published his books. By 2010, Malonso is experiencing illness according to members of the Letran Alumni Association who visited him. He reportedly experiences a lack of appetite and having difficulty of remembering names of people around him. On May 12, 2013, Malonso died of a lingering illness.

Personal life
Malonso married fellow Letran educator, Honorata “Auring” Aves Tan. Tan is the aunt of Senator Tito Sotto and Vic Sotto. Tan and Malonso got married in 1949

References

1923 births
2013 deaths
People from Binondo
Filipino men's basketball players
Filipino military leaders
Filipino sports executives and administrators
University of the Philippines alumni
Centers (basketball)
UST Growling Tigers basketball players
Basketball players from Manila